Oberea auricollis is a species of flat-faced longhorn beetle in the tribe Saperdini in the genus Oberea. It was described by Per Olof Christopher Aurivillius in 1922.

References

A
Beetles described in 1922